Ashok Krishnamoorthy is an electrical engineer from Oracle Labs in San Diego, California. He was named a Fellow of the Institute of Electrical and Electronics Engineers (IEEE) in 2012 for his contributions to optical interconnect devices and their system applications.

References

Fellow Members of the IEEE
Living people
Year of birth missing (living people)
Place of birth missing (living people)
American electrical engineers